Lozada is an elite Spanish family originating in the provinces of Asturias and Castilla y Leon, as well as Cantabria.

The family branch in Spain still holds their respective aristocratic titles like count de Bague, Palancar, Viscount of Miranda and Guadalupe.

The family seat is "La Plazuela de Miranda".

Famous Lozadas include:

 Carlos Lozada (born 1971), Peruvian-American journalist, author, and the nonfiction book critic of The Washington Post
 Diego de Losada (Lozada) (1511–1569), Spanish colonial conquistador and founder of Caracas, the capital of Venezuela
 Gerardo Lozada, Peruvian doctor known for helping Lina Medina, the youngest confirmed mother in history, give birth to her son
 Johnny Lozada (born 1967), Puerto Rican singer, show host and actor, member of boy band Menudo
 Jorge Lozada Stanbury (1931–2018), Peruvian politician